The Left Front is a united front of leftist political organizations in Russia. It is strongly critical of President Vladimir Putin.

History
The first constituent congress of the Left Front was held on 18 October 2008, in Moscow. The main direction of work after the Congress was using social movements, unions, and labor collectives. The secondary focus of activists has been called "propaganda of action", in which the use of ideas and demands of leftist activists is supposed to be brought to society in the form of direct action, thus attempting to overcome the difficulties of access to media. In addition, the Left Front was the organizer of the annual summer youth camps, schools, political activists, conferences, study groups for the study of socialist thought and practice, film clubs, concerts and other activities.

In total, over one and a half years (summer 2008 – autumn 2009), there have been more than 40 regional conferences, established under the areas of the country offices of the front.

Actions

The Left Front organizes a variety of authorized and unauthorized actions, rallies, and marches. The most famous of the promotions are meetings under the title "Day of Wrath", which is hosted by the organization in Moscow and in other regions of the country. In addition, the Left Front, together with its allies, despite a governmental ban conduct actions under the name of "anti-capitalism", which aims, according to organizers, to show the public presence of political forces of anti-capitalist orientation.

Position against war in Donbass
The Left Front declared its position against the war in the South-East of Ukraine. The fourth congress of the movement took place in Moscow on 23 August 2014. The delegates elected the new executive committee. No supporters of the self-proclaimed republics were elected. The ex-coordinator of the Left Front on organizational work, Sergei Udaltsov, supporting Novorossiya, was selected in the executive branch of movement with preponderance only in one voice. Also during congress was accepted resolution under the name "War against war!". Darya Mitina, the former member of the Council of the organization left the organization afterwards.

"We need the campaign for peace. Against the bloodshed and the mass selling of blood. This campaign shouldn't be the support of the war in the back areas of the "opponent". Being against the military operation of the Kiev government doesn't mean supporting Putin and Strelkov. Being against Putin doesn't mean supporting Kiev government military operation. People need a campaign for peace against the greedy and cruel politicians and oligarchs, making profit of the others' grief. " – says the resolution of the congress.

Structure
The highest governing body of the Left Front is the Congress. The Council of the Left Front carries out the current leadership of the movement, and the Executive committee is an operational working body of the organization.

References

External links

2008 establishments in Russia
Civil disobedience
Communist organizations in Russia
Opposition to Vladimir Putin
Organizations associated with the Communist Party of the Russian Federation
Organizations established in 2008
Political organizations based in Russia
Russia